Larry Harmon Pictures was the production company of Larry Harmon, the owner of the characters Bozo the Clown and Laurel & Hardy.

Lou Scheimer was an art director for Larry Harmon Pictures during its brief foray into animated television. The cartoons feature Bozo the Clown, as well as Popeye, Mr. Magoo, Dick Tracy and Laurel and Hardy. After Harmon exited the animation business, Scheimer formed Filmation, which went on to be a leading producer of television animation.

References

External links
 Official website
 ABC News Investigates Bozo's Origin (2001)
 ABC News: Bozo Finally Unmasked (2004)
 Associated Press: Who's the First Bozo? (2004)
 
 The Austin Chronicle: Article on Harmon and his Laurel & Hardy movie (2000)

Film production companies of the United States
Television production companies of the United States